Ahmad Ashkar  (born 12 December 1996) is a Syrian football midfielder. He currently plays for Al-Ittihad in Syrian Premier League.

International debut
On March 29, 2016, Ashkar made his International debut against Japan in a FIFA World Cup qual. match that ended 5–0 for Japan.

International goals

Syria U23

Syria

References

External links
 Player Profile on soccerway.com
 Player Profile on 11v11.com

1996 births
Living people
Syrian footballers
Syria international footballers
Association football midfielders
Footballers at the 2018 Asian Games
2019 AFC Asian Cup players
Al-Jaish Damascus players
Sportspeople from Aleppo
Asian Games competitors for Syria
Syrian Premier League players
Al-Ittihad Aleppo players
Hidd SCC players
Syrian expatriate sportspeople in Bahrain
Expatriate footballers in Bahrain
Bahraini Premier League players
Syrian expatriate footballers
Hurriya SC players
21st-century Syrian people